The following is a list of the 17 cantons of the Vaucluse department, in France, following the French canton reorganisation which came into effect in March 2015:

 Apt
 Avignon-1
 Avignon-2
 Avignon-3
 Bollène
 Carpentras
 Cavaillon
 Cheval-Blanc
 L'Isle-sur-la-Sorgue
 Monteux
 Orange
 Pernes-les-Fontaines
 Pertuis
 Le Pontet
 Sorgues
 Vaison-la-Romaine
 Valréas

References